William Garven Stewart (7 January 1875 – 30 April 1951) was a Scottish footballer who played as an outside right.

Career
Born in Glasgow, Stewart played club football for Queen's Park (most of his time there being in the period before the club joined the Scottish Football League), Third Lanark (appearing in the Scottish Cup only) and Newcastle United, and made two appearances for Scotland. He scored five goals in 41 appearances in all competitions for Newcastle, where he had moved as a result of his profession outside the game as a maritime engineer. He later settled on Merseyside.

References

1875 births
1951 deaths
Scottish footballers
Footballers from Glasgow
Scotland international footballers
Third Lanark A.C. players
St Bernard's F.C. players
Queen's Park F.C. players
Newcastle United F.C. players
Scottish Football League players
English Football League players
Association football outside forwards